Hannah Devlin is an author in London and science correspondent for The Guardian.

Education 
Devlin attended St Bede's College, Manchester, where she studied A-Levels in Maths, Physics, French and General Studies. She completed an undergraduate degree in physics at Imperial College London in 2004 She has a Doctor of Philosophy degree in functional magnetic resonance imaging from the University of Oxford for research supervised by Peter Jezzard. In 2006, whilst Devlin was a DPhil student, she worked for The Times on a British Science Association Media Fellowship. She began her career as a journalist whilst completing her postgraduate studies. She was a finalist for the Young Science Writers award.

Career 
Devlin worked for Research Fortnight for a year, before getting a permanent job at The Times in 2009.

In 2015, Devlin was appointed to The Guardian. She works as the science correspondent for The Guardian, as well as presenting their podcast Science Weekly. Devlin has also written for the journal Science. In 2017 she gave a keynote talk at the Human Tissue Association's annual conference.  She has been shortlisted for the 2017 The Press Awards Science Journalist of the Year.

Devlin is an advocate for women in science. In 2011 she chaired a debate with Athene Donald, Ottoline Leyser and Keith Laws called Women of science, do you know your place?. She has contributed opinion pieces such as Why don't women win Nobel science prizes? and Why are there so few women in tech? The truth behind the Google memo.

References

Living people
People educated at St Bede's College, Manchester
Alumni of the University of Oxford
Alumni of Imperial College London
British science journalists
English women journalists
Women science writers
Year of birth missing (living people)